Pulin Mitra (born 15 December 1926) is an Indian former cricketer. He played one first-class match for Bengal in 1947/48.

See also
 List of Bengal cricketers

References

External links
 

1926 births
Possibly living people
Indian cricketers
Bengal cricketers
Cricketers from Kolkata